The 2018 NCAA Division I men's ice hockey tournament was the national championship tournament for men's college ice hockey in the United States. The tournament involved 16 teams in single-elimination play to determine the national champion at the Division I level of the National Collegiate Athletic Association (NCAA), the highest level of competition in college hockey. The tournament's Frozen Four – the semifinals and final – were hosted by the University of Minnesota at the Xcel Energy Center in St. Paul, Minnesota from April 5–7, 2018.

Minnesota-Duluth defeated Notre Dame 2–1 to win the program's 2nd NCAA title.

Tournament procedure

The tournament is composed of four groups of four teams in regional brackets.  The four regionals are officially named after their geographic areas.  The following are the sites for the 2018 regionals:

March 23–24 
East Regional, Webster Bank Arena – Bridgeport, Connecticut (Host: Fairfield and Yale)
West Regional, Premier Center – Sioux Falls, South Dakota (Host: North Dakota)
March 24–25
Northeast Regional, DCU Center – Worcester, Massachusetts (Host: Holy Cross)
Midwest Regional, PPL Center – Allentown, Pennsylvania (Host: Penn State)

The winner of each regional will advance to the Frozen Four:
April 5–7
Xcel Energy Center – St. Paul, Minnesota (Host: University of Minnesota)

Qualifying teams
The at-large bids and seeding for each team in the tournament were announced on March 18. The Big Ten had four teams receive a berth in the tournament, the NCHC, Hockey East, and ECAC Hockey each had three teams receive a berth, the Western Collegiate Hockey Association (WCHA) had two teams receive a berth, and one team from Atlantic Hockey received a berth.

Number in parentheses denotes overall seed in the tournament.

Tournament bracket 

Note: * denotes overtime period

Results

West Region – Sioux Falls, South Dakota

Regional semifinal

Regional Final

East Region – Bridgeport, Connecticut

Regional semifinal

Regional Final

Northeast Region – Worcester, Massachusetts

Regional semifinal

Regional Final

Midwest Region – Allentown, Pennsylvania

Regional semifinal

Regional Final

Frozen Four – Xcel Energy Center, St. Paul, Minnesota

National semifinal

2018 National Championship

(E1) Notre Dame vs. (W3) Minnesota–Duluth

All-Tournament team
G: Hunter Shepard (Minnesota–Duluth)
D: Scott Perunovich (Minnesota–Duluth)
D: Jordan Gross (Notre Dame)
F: Karson Kuhlman* (Minnesota–Duluth)
F: Jared Thomas (Minnesota–Duluth)
F: Andrew Oglevie (Notre Dame)
* Most Outstanding Player(s)

Record by conference

Media

Television
ESPN has US television rights to all games during the tournament for the fourteenth consecutive year. ESPN will air every game, beginning with the regionals, on ESPN, ESPN2, ESPNews, ESPNU, or ESPN3 and streamed them online via WatchESPN.

In Canada, the tournament will be broadcast by TSN and streamed on TSN Go.

In the UK, the tournament will be broadcast by BT Sport ESPN.

Broadcast assignments
Regionals
East Regional: John Buccigross, Barry Melrose and Quint Kessenich – Bridgeport, Connecticut
West Regional: Clay Matvick and Sean Ritchlin – Sioux Falls, South Dakota
Northeast Regional: Joe Beninati and Billy Jaffe – Worcester, Massachusetts
Midwest Regional: Kevin Brown and Colby Cohen – Allentown, Pennsylvania

Frozen Four
John Buccigross, Barry Melrose and Quint Kessenich – St. Paul, Minnesota

Radio
Westwood One has exclusive radio rights to the Frozen Four and will air both the semifinals and the championship.
Brian Tripp, Pat Micheletti, & Shireen Saski

References

Tournament
NCAA Division I men's ice hockey tournament
NCAA Division I men's ice hockey tournament
NCAA Division I men's ice hockey tournament
NCAA Division I men's ice hockey tournament
NCAA Division I men's ice hockey tournament
NCAA Division I men's ice hockey tournament
NCAA Division I men's ice hockey tournament
NCAA Division I men's ice hockey tournament
21st century in Saint Paul, Minnesota
History of Allentown, Pennsylvania
History of Sioux Falls, South Dakota
Ice hockey competitions in Bridgeport, Connecticut
Ice hockey competitions in Pennsylvania
Ice hockey competitions in Worcester, Massachusetts
Ice hockey competitions in Saint Paul, Minnesota
Ice hockey competitions in South Dakota
Sports in Allentown, Pennsylvania
Sports in Sioux Falls, South Dakota